Dismorphia spio, the Hispaniolan mimic-white or Haitian mimic, is a species of butterfly of the family Pieridae. It is found on Hispaniola and in Puerto Rico.  

This species mimics Heliconius charitonius.

The wingspan is 50–60 mm. Adults are black with yellow or orange with strikingly pointy forewings. It exhibits sexual dimorphism, mainly in the pattern of the hindwing. In males, there is a white area along the frontal edge, while this is absent in females.

References

Dismorphiinae
Pieridae of South America
Butterflies described in 1824
Insects of Haiti
Insects of the Dominican Republic